Levels Valley is a small rural community in the Timaru District, New Zealand. It is located south-west of Pleasant Point and north-west of Timaru. Papaka Stream runs through the area.

Demographics

Levels Valley had a population of 1,044 at the 2018 New Zealand census, an increase of 30 people (3.0%) since the 2013 census, and an increase of 99 people (10.5%) since the 2006 census. There were 390 households. There were 564 males and 483 females, giving a sex ratio of 1.17 males per female. The median age was 45.2 years (compared with 37.4 years nationally), with 228 people (21.8%) aged under 15 years, 114 (10.9%) aged 15 to 29, 552 (52.9%) aged 30 to 64, and 150 (14.4%) aged 65 or older.

Ethnicities were 94.8% European/Pākehā, 7.2% Māori, 0.6% Pacific peoples, 2.3% Asian, and 1.4% other ethnicities (totals add to more than 100% since people could identify with multiple ethnicities).

The proportion of people born overseas was 12.4%, compared with 27.1% nationally.

Although some people objected to giving their religion, 45.7% had no religion, 44.8% were Christian, 0.3% were Buddhist and 0.9% had other religions.

Of those at least 15 years old, 147 (18.0%) people had a bachelor or higher degree, and 156 (19.1%) people had no formal qualifications. The median income was $37,000, compared with $31,800 nationally. The employment status of those at least 15 was that 465 (57.0%) people were employed full-time, 165 (20.2%) were part-time, and 12 (1.5%) were unemployed.

References

Timaru District
Populated places in Canterbury, New Zealand